Chardine Taylor-Stone (born 5 July 1985) is a British feminist activist, writer and musician. In December 2015 Taylor-Stone founded Stop Rainbow Racism to campaign against the performance of ‘Black face’ at LGBTQ+ Venues. The campaign began in response to a performance by Drag queen Charlie Hides at The Royal Vauxhall Tavern. Taylor-Stone is the drummer for Big Joanie since the band was founded in 2013.

Early life and education 
Taylor-Stone was born in London and is from a working-class background. She was raised in Kettering where at age 17 she first became politically active in the Stop The War Coalition. She studied a BA Arts and Humanities and Masters in Laws (LLM) at Birkbeck, University of London.

Career 
In 2015 Taylor-Stone organised an intergenerational one-day conference ‘Black British Feminism: Past, Present and Futures’ at the Black Cultural Archives in Brixton with Black feminist and friend of Olive Morris, Liz Obi . In 2016 she co-founded Black Girls Picnic with cultural activist Kayza Rose. In 2017 Taylor-Stone won the British LGBT Award for Contribution to LGBT+ life for the Stop Rainbow Racism campaign. In 2021 she returned the award in protest at the award’s sponsorship of MI5 and MI6

Taylor-Stone has written and spoken about Black British Feminism, racism in LGBT Communities, British working-class life, Afrofuturism, music and socialism.  In 2022 Big Joanie were nominated for Best Alternative Act at the MOBO Awards.

Awards and recognition 
·       British LGBT Award for Contribution to LGBT+ life (2017)

·       The Voice Newspaper's Women Who Rocked the World (2015)

·       The Most Inspiring British LGBT People Of 2016

·       Pride Power List 2018

·       Pride Power List 2019

Essays

References 

Living people
1985 births
Black feminism
Black British activists
British LGBT musicians
LGBT Black British people
Queer musicians
Alumni of Birkbeck, University of London
People from Kettering